Volodymyr Havrylovych Luciv (5 June 1929 in Nadvirna, in eastern Poland - in present-day Ukraine - 7 September 2019 London) was a Ukrainian bandurist and tenor. He learned to play the bandura from Hryhory Nazarenko in the Leontovych Bandurist Capella in Goslar, Germany. He completed his Conservatory music studies in 1957 in Rome majoring in voice, and resided in London.

In the Ukrainian diaspora community he performed throughout the world as a bandurist and singer and is known for his performance of dumy (sung epic poems). 
Professionally he performed as a singer on cruise ships in the Mediterranean under the stage name of Tino Valdi.

He was the author of numerous articles about the history of the bandura.

Sources 

 Кавка, М. – Амабасадор української музики (Про В. Луціва) // г. “Шлях перемоги” 28 вересня, 1986
 нн - Вoлoдимир Луців // ж. Бандура #7-8, 1984
 МДЧ - Вoлoдимир Луців // ж. Бандура #43-44, 1993
 Лукaсeвич, В. - Iнтeрв'ю з бaндуристoм Вoлoдимирoм Луцівoм // ж. Бандура # 3-36, 1991
 Мудрий, С - Вiд Бистриці дo Тeмзи // ж. Бандура #71/72, 2000

1929 births
2019 deaths
People from Nadvirna
Bandurists
Kobzarstvo
Ukrainian tenors